Stauroderus is a genus of slant-faced grasshoppers in the family Acrididae. There are three described species in Stauroderus, found in the Palearctic.

Species
These three species belong to the genus Stauroderus:
 Stauroderus campestris (Stål, 1861)
 Stauroderus scalaris (Fischer von Waldheim, 1846)
 Stauroderus yunnaneus (Uvarov, 1925)

References

Gomphocerinae